Yujiang District is a district of the city of Yingtan, Jiangxi province, China.

Administrative divisions
In the present, Yujiang District has 6 towns and 5 townships.
6 towns

5 townships

Climate

References

County-level divisions of Jiangxi